The Rivière des Prairies generating station (in French: Centrale de la Rivière des Prairies) is a run of river hydroelectric power station on the Rivière des Prairies between the islands of Jesus and Montreal, Quebec, Canada. Built in 1929, it is now managed and operated by Hydro-Québec. It has a generating capacity of 48 MW. There is no lock allowing boats to bypass the dam.

Statistics:
 Year built: 1929
 Installed capacity: 48 MW
 Number of generators: 6
 Hydraulic head:  
 Hydraulic flow: ~ 
 Reservoir: n/a (run-of-river)

See also

 Île de la Visitation
List of bridges in Montreal
List of crossings of the Rivière des Prairies
List of hydroelectric stations
List of reservoirs and dams in Quebec

External links
Hydro-Québec website (English)
Hydro-Québec website (French)

Rivière des Prairies
Hydroelectric power stations in Quebec
Hydro-Québec
Buildings and structures in Laval, Quebec
Ahuntsic-Cartierville